Chris Robinson Brotherhood was an American blues rock band formed in 2011 by Black Crowes singer Chris Robinson while the Crowes were on hiatus. The original lineup consisted of Robinson (vocals, guitar), Neal Casal (lead guitar, backing vocals), Mark Dutton (bass guitar, backing vocals), George Sluppick (drums), and Adam MacDougall (keyboards). Since 2015, the band had undergone various personnel changes with Robinson and Casal remaining the only constant members. Following the death of Neal Casal in August 2019, the Chris Robinson Brotherhood announced it would disband.

History

Formation and Big Moon Ritual 
Chris Robinson Brotherhood began as an experiment but became a 'band' during their California residency tour. The original intention, according to Robinson, was to "have a local L.A. band, just play in California, see where the music takes us and have a good time." They then embarked on a 118 date North American tour in 2011. Robinson names Grateful Dead members Phil Lesh and Bob Weir, who sat in with the band during CRB's run at the Great American Music Hall, as both musical inspirations and friends. As well as Robinson, the band features fellow Black Crowes member Adam MacDougall, Ryan Adams collaborator Neal Casal, bassist Mark Dutton, and drummer George Sluppick. Robinson describes the Brotherhood as a "farm-to-table psychedelic band".

Chris Robinson Brotherhood released a version of "Blue Suede Shoes" (written by Carl Perkins) b/w a live version "Girl, I Love You" (written by Al Bell and Eddie Floyd) for Record Store Day on April 21, 2012. The CD version also features a cover of the Jimmy Reed song, "Bright Lights Big City".

The band's debut album, Big Moon Ritual, was recorded at Sunset Sound Studios, Los Angeles, and was released on June 5, 2012. Chris Robinson suggests that Big Moon Ritual is "not a concept album, but it's very conceptual sonically." He also notes that CRB "isn't the type of band that's going to make a concise four-minute song record" and that they prefer instead to make lengthier compositions.

The Magic Door 
Just three months after its predecessor, on September 11, 2012, Chris Robinson Brotherhood's second studio album, The Magic Door, was released. It was recorded at the same time as Big Moon Ritual and features a cover of the Hank Ballard song "Let's Go, Let's Go, Let's Go," which the band has often played live.

"Betty's S.F. Blends, Volume One" 
In September 2013, Chris Robinson Brotherhood released an album that featured songs picked by the Grateful Dead's record producer, Betty Cantor-Jackson, which were recorded over five nights in San Francisco. The band played 96 songs altogether and Cantor-Jackson picked the best ones for the album. The album has only been released on vinyl record format, which results in it not being available on CD. The album was called "Betty's S.F. Blends, Volume One". The 5 full shows are also available as separate downloads.

Phosphorescent Harvest 
Chris Robinson Brotherhood released its third studio album "Phosphorescent Harvest" on Silver Arrow Records on April 29, 2014. The songs on the album are mostly co-written by Chris Robinson and Neal Casal. Produced by Thom Monahan. FORMATS: 12" Vinyl / CD /  Digital Download.

Any Way You Love, We Know How You Feel and EP 
Chris Robinson Brotherhood released its fourth studio album Any Way You Love, We Know How You Feel on July 29, 2016, and on November 4, 2016, an EP titled If You Lived Here, You Would Be Home By Now, containing five songs left over from the same sessions.

Barefoot In The Head 
The CRB released their fifth studio album Barefoot In The Head in 2017.

Servants of the Sun 
Chris Robinson Brotherhood released their sixth studio album, Servants of the Sun, on June 14, 2019. As Robinson notes, he wrote the songs on the new album with the idea that they would definitely be played live. "With our last couple of albums we made songs we knew we probably weren't going to play live," he said. "This time around every one of these songs will fall into the live repertoire."

Personnel 
 Chris Robinson – lead vocals, guitars (2011–2019)
Neal Casal – guitars, vocals (2011–2019; his death)
Adam MacDougall – keyboards (2011–2019)
Mark "Muddy" Dutton – bass guitar, vocals (2011–2016)
George Sluppick – drums (2011–2015)
Tony Leone – drums (2015–2019)
Jeff Hill – bass guitar (2016–2019)
Joel Robinow – keyboards (2019)
Pete Sears – keyboards (2019)

Discography

Studio albums

Live albums

Singles

References

External links 

 Download Taper sources
 Show Reviews, Galleries, News and More

The Black Crowes
American blues rock musical groups
Jam bands
Musical groups established in 2011
Musical groups from Los Angeles
2011 establishments in California